Wild Orchid is a 1989 American erotic film directed by Zalman King and starring Mickey Rourke, Carré Otis, Jacqueline Bisset, Bruce Greenwood, and Assumpta Serna.

A sequel, Wild Orchid II: Two Shades of Blue, was released in 1991.

Plot 
Emily Reed travels to New York City to interview with a law firm, which offers her a job if she flies to Rio de Janeiro the following morning. Emily agrees and is introduced to Claudia Dennis, one of the firm's top executives. They arrive in Rio to finalize the purchase of a hotel, but Claudia must fly to Buenos Aires to meet the owner. Claudia instructs Emily to cover her date that night. The date is a wealthy man named James Wheeler. They have dinner accompanied by James' bodyguards.

James intrigues Emily; he is quiet and asks personal questions without being demanding or rude. After dinner, they attend a street carnival; Emily leaves after a masked man who looks like James tries seducing her. The next morning, Emily wakes to find James watching her. He gives her a bouquet of orchids and denies making advances to her the previous evening. As an apology, he offers to show her the city. They attend a party with a married couple they noticed in the restaurant. Navy sailors at the party make advances on the wife; James fights them and he, Emily, and the couple leave in his limousine. The married couple is having problems because of the wife's infidelity. She wants to reconcile with her husband. James encourages the couple to have sex in the limo. Emily finds their actions disturbing. Emily and James visit the hotel that her firm wants to buy, and she tells James that she fears he would disappear if she touched him. When Emily hugs James, he pulls away, telling her he does not like being touched.

That night, Emily dresses up for the carnival festivities and is propositioned by a man in a mask, who offers her his room key. James encourages her to accept. She realizes James is incapable of acting upon his own emotions and tries experiencing passion through others. Emily agrees to the stranger's proposal and has sex with him.

Claudia returns to Rio with the hotel's owner and arranges a meeting at the airport. Emily is humiliated when she discovers that Jerome, the owner's attorney, is the stranger she slept with; Jerome uses their encounter to intimidate Emily to get a better deal. Claudia discovers the truth and uses the information to threaten Jerome; if he does not complete the deal, she will tell his wife about the affair. After the meeting, Claudia asks Emily about James. She tells Emily that James was an only child who stuttered, and is a self-made man. Emily says she is obsessed with James, but that he would never touch her. Claudia's assistants tell her a man bought the deed to the hotel before the deal was finalized; both women realize it was James, who confirms it. Claudia proceeds with the hotel's sale, hoping to circumvent James' actions.

Claudia arranges a party to commemorate the sale of the hotel. The next morning, she invites a young surfer to her room, and asks Emily to translate what the Portuguese surfer says. Claudia, Emily and the surfer are about to have sex when James interrupts. Emily accuses James of setting people up to disappoint him and then throwing them aside. He responds that he never sets anybody up; they disappoint him of their own accord. A package is later delivered to Emily's room; James has signed over the hotel's deed, saving the deal. Emily finds James and tells him she loves him, but leaves when he does not respond.

That night, Emily returns to her room, where James is waiting for her. He tells Emily that after he had accumulated wealth, women became attracted to him and he started playing games to keep things interesting. The games became a way of life and he cannot stop playing them. Emily encourages James to reach out to her, offering him her love if he makes an effort to touch her. At first he resists, but reaches out and holds her when he thinks she will leave him. The two embrace and have sex. They later ride away on a motorcycle together.

Cast 
Mickey Rourke as James Wheeler
Carre Otis as Emily Reed
Jacqueline Bisset as Claudia Dennis
Assumpta Serna as Hanna Munch
Bruce Greenwood as Jerome McFarland
Oleg Vidov as Otto Munch
Milton Goncalves as Flavio

Production 
The film was shot in Salvador, Bahia, and Rio de Janeiro, Brazil. King's original version of the film was deemed too sexually graphic for an R-rating and the MPAA threatened to release it with an X-rating, limiting its commercial potential. King reluctantly removed part of a love scene between Otis and Rourke to comply with the R-rating. The scene was widely rumored in the media to have shown the two actors—who had become romantically involved during production of the film—actually having intercourse. Both actors denied this, but the director was ambiguous.

Release
Wild Orchid had its world premiere on December 21, 1989 in Rome, Italy. The film opened in Los Angeles on April 27, 1990 and New York on April 28, 1990.

Reception 
Wild Orchid received negative reviews from critics around the time of its release, currently maintaining a 10% rating on review aggregator Rotten Tomatoes based on 30 reviews. It was nominated for two Razzie Awards, including Worst Actor (Mickey Rourke) and Worst New Star (Carré Otis). On its opening week in Italy, it grossed $403,210 from 10 screens in six cities. The film was a box-office flop.

Soundtrack

See also 
 9½ Weeks (film)
 Fifty Shades of Grey (film)

References

External links 
 
 
 

1989 films
1989 romantic drama films
1980s American films
1980s English-language films
1980s erotic drama films
American erotic drama films
American erotic romance films
American romantic drama films
BDSM in films
Films about lawyers
Films directed by Zalman King
Films set in Rio de Janeiro (city)
Films shot in Rio de Janeiro (city)
Films shot in Salvador, Bahia